MS Nuraghes is a cruiseferry owned and operated by Tirrenia di Navigazione. It was built at Fincantieri in Castellammare di Stabia, Italy.

Features 
Nuraghes was the first of a series of two sister ships, the other being Sharden. They are an improved version of the previous Bithia class, with an additional car deck, bringing their gross register tonnage to nearly 40,000 GRT, and allowing a greater cargo capacity, (nearly 2,000 linear meters, which equals about 140 semi-trailers), or a capacity of 1,085 cars. The ship can carry up to 3,000 passengers and has nine decks:

 Deck 8: infirmary, kennels, solarium
 Deck 7: children's area, 648 second class seats, 68 cabins
 Deck 6: reception, central bar, bar of the festivals, cinema, restaurant, self-service, shops.
 Deck 5: 258 cabins
 Deck 4: mobile car deck for 265 cars
 Deck 4: car deck for 373 cars or 70 trailers
 Deck 3: car deck for 335 cars or 65 trailers
 Deck 2: car deck for 60 cars
 Deck 1: car deck for 52 cars

Despite the additional deck, and the consequent increase in displacement, the ships are propelled by the same diesel engines as the Bithia class. Four Wärtsilä 12V46C generate a power of more than 51,000 kW, allowing a top speed of 29 knots (53.70 km/h).
This performance is fully exploited only for the daytime crossings and in the high season, i.e., when passenger and vehicle traffic justifies the larger fuel consumption; otherwise, the ship keeps a speed between 19 and 23 knots, by using only two of its four engines, in order to save fuel.

History 

Nuraghes was launched by Fincantieri on January 24, 2004. and entered service on the Civitavecchia-Olbia line on 15 July 2004.

On September 17, 2004,  Nuraghes , two months after completion, was rammed around 20:00 by GNV's ferry La Superba while the latter was mooring in Olbia harbour.  Nuraghes  was moored at dock 3 since that morning, and was waiting to leave for Civitavecchia at 23:00. At the time of the collision, only the crew was aboard. Nuraghes suffered damage to the bow, the bridge, and part of the stern; a lifeboat fell into the sea, while an inflatable raft remained hanging in midair. After controls by the Italian Naval Register, Nuraghes  sailed late for Civitavecchia. The accident was blamed on the command of La Superba, which did not require the support of a tug boat despite the bad weather.

On June 21, 2006, around 13:00 hours, Nuraghes , sailing from Civitavecchia to Olbia, was rammed by Moby Lines's ferry  Moby Fantasy in the Gulf of Olbia. Moby Fantasy'bow opened a gash in Nuraghes's side, but nobody suffered serious injuries. According to the Italian Prosecutors Office, responsibility laid with the command of Nuraghes, which did not respect the precedence and kept a speed of 28 knots. A contributing cause was the lack of visibility present in that moment in the Gulf. According to the public prosecutor, emergency sound signals were not used and the radio communications were unadequate.

Nuraghes is currently operated on the Genoa-Porto Torres line.

See also
Largest ferries of Europe

References

External links
 

Ferries of Italy
Cruiseferries
Ships built in Castellammare di Stabia
2004 ships
Ships built by Fincantieri